A Man on the Moon: The Voyages of the Apollo Astronauts is a 1994 book by Andrew Chaikin. It describes the 1968-1972 voyages of the Apollo program astronauts in detail, from Apollo 8 to 17.

"A decade in the making, this book is based on hundreds of hours of in-depth interviews with each of the twenty-four moon voyagers, as well as those who contributed their brain power, training and teamwork on Earth."

This book formed the basis of the 1998 television miniseries From the Earth to the Moon. It was released in paperback in 2007 by Penguin Books, .

References

1994 non-fiction books
Spaceflight books
Apollo program